Ebenezer Battelle (1754–1815) was an American Revolutionary War veteran, a bookseller in Boston, Massachusetts, and a settler of Marietta, Ohio, in the late 18th century.

Life in Dedham
Battelle was born in 1754 in Dedham, Massachusetts, to Ebenezer Battle (d.1776) and Prudence Draper. He attended Harvard College (class of 1775); schoolmates included Fisher Ames and Benjamin Bourne. He was a member of the Sons of Liberty and the Free Brothers in Dedham.

He was also town clerk for a total of two years, having first been elected in 1778, and selectman for two terms, with his first election the same year.

He was one of three, along with Nathaniel Ames and Abijah Draper who erected the Pillar of Liberty in Dedham in 1766 to commemorate the repeal of the Stamp Act.

Military
He "was a volunteer at the battle of Lexington. ... [In 1776, he] served nineteen days at Castle Island, Dec. 11 to Dec. 30, 1776; went on the expedition to Providence, R.I., May 8 to July 8, 1777; re-enlisted, and served from March 23 to April 5, 1778, and was commissioned captain of the Eighth Company in the Suffolk Regiment, July 2, 1778. He was promoted to be major, April 1, 1780, and became colonel of the Boston regiment in 1784." He joined the Ancient and Honorable Artillery Company of Massachusetts in 1786.

Bookseller
After the war Battelle sold and published books from his shop in Boston on State Street (ca.1783-1785) and Marlboro Street (1785-ca.1787). In addition to books imported from London, he stocked American publications such as Isaiah Thomas' Almanack and Noah Webster's Grammatical Institutes.

Personal life

Battelle married Anna Durant; children included Ebenezer Battelle (b.1778) and Thomas Battelle (b.1781). Battelle and his family settled in Marietta, Ohio, around 1789.

On July 26, 1783, Henry Belcher of Boston wrote to Battelle asking to be paid $8 for a beaver skin hat that Belcher sold to Battelle but for which he had not yet received payment.

See also
 List of booksellers in Boston

References

Works cited

Further reading

 Battelle family. In: History of Ohio: the rise and progress of an American state, Volume 6. Century History Co., 1912.

1754 births
1815 deaths
Businesspeople from Boston
18th century in Boston
Continental Army soldiers
Businesspeople from Dedham, Massachusetts
American booksellers
People from Marietta, Ohio
Harvard College alumni
People of colonial Massachusetts
Dedham, Massachusetts selectmen
Dedham Town Clerks
People from colonial Dedham, Massachusetts